T. V. Chandran (born 23 November 1950) is an Indian film director, screenwriter, and actor, predominantly working in Malayalam cinema. Born in a Malayali family in Telicherry, Chandran worked as a Reserve Bank of India employee before entering into the film industry. He started his film career as an assistant director to P. A. Backer. He also acted the lead role in Backer's highly acclaimed political drama Kabani Nadi Chuvannappol (1975). He made his directorial debut with the unreleased feature Krishnan Kutty (1981), and followed this with the Tamil film Hemavin Kadhalargal (1985). Chandran came into prominence after Alicinte Anveshanam (1989), which was nominated for the Golden Leopard at the Locarno International Film Festival. This was followed with Ponthan Mada (1993), his most famous film to-date. Chandran is most known for his art-house films which have references to history and undertones of politics and feminism. He is also known for his trilogy on 2002 Gujarat riots, consisting of Kathavasheshan (2004), Vilapangalkappuram (2008) and Bhoomiyude Avakashikal (2012). Other highly acclaimed films include Mangamma (1997), Dany (2001) and Paadam Onnu: Oru Vilapam (2003).

Chandran has won several film awards including six National Film Awards and ten Kerala State Film Awards. In addition to these, he is a recipient of a number of awards at various International film festivals.

Early life and background
T. V. Chandran was born in Telicherry (Thalassery), Malabar District, Madras Presidency, the present day Kannur District, Kerala, to Narayanan  and Karthyayini Amma. After graduating with a degree from Christ College, Irinjalakuda, and a post graduation from Farook College, University of Calicut, he embarked on a career as a Reserve Bank of India employee before starting his film career. In his college days, Chandran was sympathetic to naxalite ideology and was closely associated with the Communist Party.

Chandran's son Yadavan Chandran and brother Soman are also filmmakers. Yadavan has directed docu-films and has assisted Chandran in many of his films. Soman is working an assistant with Chandran right from his first film. Chandran's attachment with his other brother, who died in Nigeria in the 1980s, later inspired the film Sankaranum Mohananum.

Career

Early years: 1975–1981
T. V. Chandran has had no formal training in film-making. He began his film career as an actor in P. A. Backer's Kabani Nadi Chuvannappol (1975). The leftist political cinema that came out during the Emergency period was adjudged Second Best Film in the Kerala State Film Awards. P. A. Backer was awarded Best Director that year for his directorial debut. The cast includes T. V. Chandran, Raveendran, J. Siddiqui and Shalini.

Chandran then worked as an assistant to P. A. Backer and the avant-garde filmmaker John Abraham. According to Chandran, it was his association with director V. K. Pavithran (who also produced Kabani Nadi Chuvannappol), that caused his transformation into the "condemned status" of a filmmaker. He says: "Our association had begun when I was just over 14, and since then we used to clandestinely share our interest in the film medium. Filmmaking was an event of celebration in the case of Pavithran and every phase of his productions had an exciting participation of the masses."

Breakthrough: 1981–89
Chandran debuted as a director with Krishnan Kutty (1981). A critical and commercial failure, this experimental film did not even had a wide public release. The film represents a continuation of P. A. Backer's style of independent film. Chandran's next venture was the Tamil feature film Hemavin Kadhalargal (1985). This film starred Delhi Ganesh and Anuradha. The film marked the debut of the latter, who dominated the Tamil cinema for quite a long time. Though Hemavin Kadhalargal was a commercial success and garnered favourable reviews, Chandran got his much needed break only with his third venture Alicinte Anveshanam (1989). A mystery film by genre, it narrated the journey of a lady in search of her missing husband. It was the official entry from India for the Locarno International Film Festival, and got a nomination for the Golden Leopard.

International acclaim: 1993–2001
In 1993, Chandran's much acclaimed Ponthan Mada, was released. He cast two of India's greatest method actors, Mammootty and Nasiruddin Shah, in the film that focused on the feudal era. It was based on C. V. Sreeraman's two short stories: "Ponthan Mada" and "Sheema Thampuran". The film earned the national and state awards to Mammootty.

Chandran's next venture Ormakal Undayirikkanam (1995) starred Bharath Gopi, Mammootty, Master Nitin, Nedumudi Venu and Sreenivasan. It portrayed the rise of the Communists to power in 1957 and the Vimochana Samaram (Liberation Struggle) of 1959. The film earned a national and a state award to Chandran. Film critic Kozhikodan included the film on his list of the ten best Malayalam movies of all time. With critical success coming back to back, Chandran wrote and directed Mangamma. Produced by the National Film Development Corporation of India (NFDC), it was screened at the Zanzibar International Film Festival. The film won many major awards, including national and state awards.

The references to feminism can be best observed in Susanna (2000), a drama about Susanna, who appears to be a prostitute living with five different people at the same time. Vani Viswanath played the title role, widely appreciated to be the best in her career. Chandran originally cast noted danseuse Mallika Sarabhai in this role, but she opted out citing her busy schedules. As a compensation, Mallika Sarabhai was given a major role by Chandran in his next venture Dany (2001), a comedy drama with Mammootty in the title role. It was Chandran's third collaboration with Mammootty. The film garnered universal acclaim with most of the critics hailing the performance of Mammootty. Chandran himself has rated this as the finest performance by any lead actor. The protagonist of this film is a mute witness to many historical world events. It won numerous awards including a National Film Award and three State Film Awards.

Paadam Onnu: Oru Vilapam and onwards: 2003-present
Chandrans following project, Paadam Onnu: Oru Vilapam (2003), dealt with child marriage and polygamy prevailing in traditional Muslim communities of Kerala. Meera Jasmine played the lead role, who won the National and State Film Award for Best Actress for her performance in the film as a teen age Muslim girl. The premiere of the film saw protests from a group of Islamic periodicals of Kerala. The date of release was postponed more than once for this reason. The film won the National Film Award for Best Film on Family Welfare. T. V. Chandran narrowly missed his second national award as the best director for this film. As there was a tie, the casting vote of the Chairman of jury went to Bengali director Goutam Ghose. With Paadam Onnu: Oru Vilapam, Chandran ended his association with music director Johnson, bringing in background music specialist Issac Thomas Kottukapally to score his social thriller Kathavasheshan (2004). Co-produced by and starring Dileep, the film follows a murder mystery. The film tells the story of a civil engineer who commits suicide as a protest against the 2002 Gujarat riots. The film stands odd in the filmography of Chandran for the narrative style it had. The film emerged the biggest winner at the Kerala State Film Awards with four wins. Chandran then worked in a Tamil psychological drama - Aadum Koothu (2005). The film unfolds from the life of a college student who can see what others don't. The film – starring Navya Nair, Cheran and Prakash Raj – was screened at various film festivals in 2005–06, but was not released in theatres. It won the National Film Award for Best Feature Film in Tamil in 2005. Vilapangalkkappuram - based on the aftermath of the Gujarat riots of 2002 - was released in 2005. Priyanka, Biju Menon, Sudheesh and Suhasini played the pivotal roles, and Priyanka won a state award for her performance in the film as a Muslim woman gang raped by a group of communalists.

In 2008, Chandran returned as an actor after his debut in Kabani Nadi Chuvannappol, in M. G. Sasi's Atayalangal. He played the supporting role of Bhaskara Kurup in the film that won five state film awards. With Boomi Malayalam (2009), another film focusing on themes of feminism, he associated with Suresh Gopi for the first time. The film was structurally different from Chandran's earlier attempts at mapping female life as the film depicted the plight of seven different women who represent different periods of time with all of them sharing a common feeling—–fear.

Most of Chandran's films were average performers at the box office even though they received strong positive reviews from critics and garnered awards at state, national and international levels. All of his films were screened at major national and international film festivals. He forayed into mainstream cinema with his next venture - Sankaranum Mohananum (2011) - a comedy fantasy starring Jayasurya, Meera Nandan and Rima Kallingal. The film had Jayasurya appearing in 20 different getups. It was not a commercial success and was panned by critics. The film was screened at the "Malayalam Cinema Today" Section of the International Film Festival of Kerala.

Chandran concluded his trilogy on 2002 Gujarat riots with the film Bhoomiyude Avakashikal (2012), a drama starring Kailash and Sreenivasan. The film started production in June 2012 and had its title adapted from the famous short story "Bhoomiyude Avakashikal" by Vaikom Muhammad Basheer. The film's protagonist is driven away from Ahmedabad following the riots and eventually lands up in a secluded house in Kerala, in the company of insects and animals with whom he shares his thoughts, concerns, doubts and frustrations. The film was an official selection at at least three film festivals.

In August 2018, Chandran started the production works of his next project Pengalila which depicts the emotional bond between an 8-year-old girl and a 65-year-old daily wage worker who comes to clean up the backyard of the girl's house.

Chandran has also directed a few tele-films and tele-serials. Notable among them are the tele-film Varum Varaykakal, which won the State TV Award for Second Best Tele-film, and the tele-serial, Sadasivante Kumbasaram.

Awards
National Film Awards
 1993 - National Film Award for Best Director                 : Ponthan Mada
 1995 - National Film Award for Best Feature Film in Malayalam: Ormakal Undayirikkanam
 1997 - National Film Award for Best Feature Film in Malayalam: Mangamma
 2001 - National Film Award for Best Feature Film in Malayalam: Dany
 2003 - National Film Award for Best Film on Family Welfare   : Paadam Onnu: Oru Vilapam
 2005 - National Film Award for Best Feature Film in Tamil    : Aadum Koothu

Kerala State Film Awards
 1989 - Kerala State Film Award for Second Best Film: Alicinte Anveshanam
 1993 - Kerala State Film Award for Second Best Film: Ponthan Mada
 1995 - Kerala State Film Award (Special Jury Award): Ormakal Undayirikkanam
 1997 - Kerala State Film Award for Best Director   : Mangamma
 2000 - Kerala State Film Award (Special Jury Award):Susanna
 2001 - Kerala State Film Award for Best Director   : Dany
 2003 - Kerala State Film Award for Second Best Film: Paadam Onnu: Oru Vilapam
 2004 - Kerala State Film Award for Second Best Film: Kathavasheshan
 2004 - Kerala State Film Award for Best Screenplay : Kathavasheshan
 2008 - Kerala State Film Award for Second Best Film: Boomi Malayalam

Filmography

 As actor
 Kabani Nadi Chuvannappol (When the River Kabani Turned Red; 1976)
 Kattu Vannu Vilichappol (2000)
 Atayalangal (The Imprints; 2008)

References

External links
 
 
 T. V. Chandran at Cinema of Malayalam
Official Website of Information and Public Relation Department of Kerala

People from Thalassery
1950 births
Living people
University of Calicut alumni
Malayalam film directors
Malayalam film producers
Malayalam screenwriters
Male actors in Malayalam cinema
Tamil film directors
Tamil film producers
Tamil screenwriters
Kerala State Film Award winners
20th-century Indian male actors
21st-century Indian male actors
Best Director National Film Award winners
20th-century Indian film directors
21st-century Indian film directors
Screenwriters from Kerala
Film producers from Kerala
Film directors from Kerala
20th-century Indian dramatists and playwrights
21st-century Indian dramatists and playwrights
Male actors from Kerala
Indian male film actors
Directors who won the Best Film on Family Welfare National Film Award